The 2006 Lenox Industrial Tools 300 was a NASCAR Nextel Cup Series race held on July 16, 2006 at New Hampshire International Speedway, in Loudon, New Hampshire. Contested over 308 laps – extended from 300 laps due to a green-white-checker finish – on the  speedway, it was the 19th race of the 2006 NASCAR Nextel Cup Series season. Kyle Busch of Hendrick Motorsports won the race.

Background
New Hampshire International Speedway is a  oval speedway located in Loudon, New Hampshire which has hosted NASCAR racing annually since the early 1990s, as well as an IndyCar weekend and the oldest motorcycle race in North America, the Loudon Classic.  Nicknamed "The Magic Mile", the speedway is often converted into a  road course, which includes much of the oval. The track was originally the site of Bryar Motorsports Park before being purchased and redeveloped by Bob Bahre. The track is one of eight major NASCAR tracks owned and operated by Speedway Motorsports.

Qualifying

Results

Race Statistics
 Time of race: 3:12:51
 Average Speed: 
 Pole Speed: 
 Cautions: 11 for 49 laps
 Margin of Victory: 0.406 sec
 Lead changes: 21
 Percent of race run under caution: 15.9%         
 Average green flag run: 21.6 laps

References

Lenox Industrial Tools 300
Lenox Industrial Tools 300
NASCAR races at New Hampshire Motor Speedway
July 2006 sports events in the United States